Anna Angelina Komnene Doukaina was a daughter of Theodore Komnenos Doukas and Maria Petraliphaina. Anna was Queen-consort of Serbia as wife of King Stefan Radoslav.

In 1216, Radoslav's father attempted to organize a marriage between his son and Theodora, daughter of Theodore's half-brother Michael Doukas Komnenos Angelos. However, the Church prohibited this marriage because it would have been between cousins of the seventh degree. Instead, Radoslav married Anna shortly after.

She was disliked by the Church and the nobility, and considered a corrupting influence on Radoslav - who was already too Greek-influenced in their eyes, as he unconditionally allied himself with Epirus and identified with his mother's Greek dynasty as much as with the Nemanjić.

Theodore Doukas Komnenos Angelos was defeated and captured in the Battle of Klokotnitsa with Bulgaria in the spring of 1230. Dissent among the Serbian nobility grew as Radoslav's inflexible pro-Greek orientation now became a problem. Thus, a coalition of Serbian aristocrats led by Radoslav's half-brother Vladislav ousted him in early 1234.

Radoslav and Anna first went to Ragusa and attempted to organize a counter-coup against Vladislav, but achieved little. Later, the monk Theodosius would claim Radoslav and Anna went to Dyrrhachium instead and separated there, but this claim has been proven to be false.

After some time, they returned to Serbia with the help of Archbishop Sava and took monastic vows. Radoslav's monastic name was Jovan.

Notes

References

 (Nachdruck Amsterdam: Hakkert, 1967)

 

13th-century deaths
13th-century Byzantine people
Medieval Serbian royal consorts
Byzantine queens consort
Komnenodoukas dynasty
Women of the Despotate of Epirus
Greek women of the Byzantine Empire